Emir Alihodžić (born September 2, 1993) is a Bosnian footballer who currently plays for Union Omaha in USL League One.

Career

College and amateur 
Alihodžić spent his entire college career at the University of Nebraska Omaha playing four years with the Mavericks and making 65 appearances with eight goals and three assists.

He also played in the Premier Development League for St. Louis Lions and Mississippi Brilla.

Professional 
On January 19, 2016, Alihodžić became the first Nebraska-Omaha player to be drafted in MLS after being selected in the third round (54th overall) of the 2016 MLS SuperDraft by Seattle Sounders FC. He was cut during preseason and on March 9, signed a professional contract with USL affiliate club Seattle Sounders FC 2. He made his professional debut on March 25 in a 1–0 defeat against Sacramento Republic.

On May 17, 2017, he signed with Saint Louis FC of the USL. He joined Fresno FC from Bosnian side Mladost in 2019.

In April 2021, Alihodžić joined USL League One side Union Omaha ahead of the 2021 season.

References

External links
Omaha Mavericks bio
USL career stats - USL Championship

1993 births
Living people
Sportspeople from Tuzla
Soccer players from St. Louis
Association football midfielders
Bosnia and Herzegovina footballers
Omaha Mavericks men's soccer players
St. Louis Lions players
Mississippi Brilla players
Tacoma Defiance players
Seattle Sounders FC draft picks
Saint Louis FC players
FK Mladost Doboj Kakanj players
Fresno FC players
Union Omaha players
USL League Two players
USL Championship players
Premier League of Bosnia and Herzegovina players
Bosnia and Herzegovina expatriate footballers
Expatriate soccer players in the United States
Bosnia and Herzegovina expatriate sportspeople in the United States